(born 1940) is a Japanese physicist in the Nonlinear Dynamics group at Kyoto University who formulated the Kuramoto model and is also known for the Kuramoto–Sivashinsky equation. He is also the discoverer of so-called chimera states in networks of coupled oscillators.

Notes

Japanese physicists
Living people
Kyoto University alumni
Academic staff of Kyoto University
Academic staff of Hokkaido University
1940 births